Evergreen International Airlines Flight 17 was a cargo flight operated by Evergreen International Airlines and flown by a McDonnell Douglas DC-9. On March 18, 1989, the flight's planned route was scheduled to take it from Kelly Air Force Base (outside San Antonio) to Tinker Air Force Base (outside of Oklahoma City, Oklahoma), with a stop at Carswell Air Force Base in Fort Worth, Texas. The two pilots were the only occupants on board. Immediately after takeoff from Carswell, the aircraft's main cargo door opened, the crew lost control of the aircraft and it subsequently crashed while attempting an emergency landing, killing both pilots.

Aircraft and crew 

The aircraft involved was a McDonnel Douglas DC-9-33RC (Rapid Change) that was built in 1968 and delivered to KLM in a dual passenger-cargo configuration. It was later converted into a passenger-only aircraft in 1984. The aircraft was sold to United Aviation Services in March 1987 and then to Evergreen International Airlines two months later, where it was converted into a freighter. At the time of the accident, the aircraft had accumulated 41,931 flight hours, with 40,808 take off and landing cycles, and was powered by two Pratt & Whitney JT8D-9A turbofan engines.

The captain was 41-year-old Gerald Jack McCall, who had been with Evergreen International Airlines since 1984. He had a total of 7,238 hours of flight experience, including 1,938 hours on the DC-9. He was also a check airman on that aircraft. Other pilots who had flown with captain McCall described him as having a habit of checking the cargo door warning lights before takeoff. The first officer was 39-year-old Thomas Bill Johnston, who had 10,863 flight hours, with 1,213 of them on the DC-9. He was also type rated on Learjet aircraft.

History of the flight

Preparation 
Flight 17 was carrying equipment for the United States Air Force, including  of explosives.

On the day of the accident, the aircraft took off from Tinker Air Force Base in Oklahoma, stopping at Dyess Air Force Base, Kelly Field Annex, then, Fort Worth Carswell Air Force Base in Texas. The flight would then return to Tinker Air Force Base. After landing at Carswell Air Force Base, Air Force personnel loaded cargo onto the aircraft.
According to the cockpit voice recorder (CVR), captain McCall was the pilot flying. The flight crew calculated the following takeoff speeds:

 V1 was 
 VR (rotation speed) was 
V2 was 

At 02:00 central standard time (CST) first officer Johnston left the aircraft to close the main cargo door. He returned two minutes later. The flight crew completed the before start checklist, which included verifying that the cargo door was closed. First officer Johnston told captain McCall "Cargo door's inspected, tail stand...I've removed it, sill guards are onboard."

Accident 
Flight 17 began its takeoff roll from runway 17 at 02:09:13 and lifted off at 02:09:46. At 02:09:49, three seconds after rotation, the main cargo door partially opened, which was indicated by the CVR recording a sudden increase in background noise. The ground proximity warning system (GPWS) activated, sounding "whoop whoop terrain" four times. First officer Johnston declared an emergency to air traffic control (ATC). The controller asked the crew the nature of the emergency, and first officer Johnston replied, "okay we got a cargo door open." After ATC asked Flight 17 to report on when they were on the downward leg of their emergency final approach, the flight crew developed problems with communication. During the downwind leg, the main cargo door completely opened, causing the aircraft to yaw and roll uncontrollably. The aircraft then banked to the left, inverted, and crashed into a pasture near Saginaw. The aircraft exploded on impact, killing the crew.

Investigation 

During the investigation by National Transportation Safety Board (NTSB), it was discovered that first officer Johnston did not fully close the cargo door as he held on to the control valve handle in the closed position shorter than required and mistakenly assumed that the door was properly closed due to its locked and latched indicators having been incorrectly applied. A design flaw in the cargo door warning circuit prevented both the pilots and maintenance personnel from noticing this error.

The NTSB concluded that the accident was caused by the main cargo door opening and the subsequent loss of control of the aircraft. The reason for the loss of control alone could not be determined because simulator and wind tunnel tests were unable to verify aerodynamic movements caused by the cargo door separation and captain McCall's attempt to correct them. Evergreen International's inadequate procedures for securing the cargo door, the failure of McDonnell Douglas to provide emergency procedures for cargo doors opening mid-flight, and the failure of Federal Aviation Administration to issue an order for modifications to the cargo door warning alarms were also contributing factors.

See also 

 United Airlines Flight 811
 American Airlines Flight 96
 Turkish Airlines Flight 981
 Tropical Airways Flight 1301

References 

March 1989 events in the United States
Tarrant County, Texas
Transportation disasters in Texas
1989 in Texas
Aviation accidents and incidents in Texas
Accidents and incidents involving the McDonnell Douglas DC-9
Airliner accidents and incidents caused by pilot error
Airliner accidents and incidents caused by design or manufacturing errors
Aviation accidents and incidents in the United States in 1989